Propargite (IUPAC name 2-(4-tert-butylphenoxy)cyclohexyl prop-2-yne-1-sulfonate, trade names Mitex, Omite and Comite) is a pesticide used to kill mites (an acaricide). Symptoms of excessive exposure are eye and skin irritation, and possibly sensitization. It is highly toxic to amphibians, fish, and zooplankton, as well as having potential carcinogenity.

References
http://onlinelibrary.wiley.com/doi/10.2903/j.efsa.2011.2087/epdf

External links
 

Propargyl compounds
Insecticides
Organosulfites
Tert-butyl compounds